Local elections are scheduled to be held in Sri Lanka on 25 April 2023. More than 16.6 million Sri Lankans will be eligible to elect 8,711 members to 340 local authorities comprising 24 Municipal Councils, 41 Urban Councils and 275 Divisional Councils. These will be the first elections to be held in Sri Lanka following the major unrest the previous year, which resulted in the ousting of president Gotabaya Rajapaksa.

Background 
The last local government elections held in Sri Lanka in 2018 saw the newly formed Sri Lanka Podujana Peramuna (SLPP) winning a majority of the seats, winning 40% of the votes. The SLPP, led by former president Mahinda Rajapaksa’s brother, Gotabaya Rajapaksa would later go on to win the presidential and parliamentary elections in 2019 and 2020 respectively, to become the ruling party of Sri Lanka.

The next local elections were originally scheduled to be held the previous year, in 2022. However, due to the worsening economic crisis and instability in the country, the elections were postponed indefinitely by then president Gotabaya Rajapaksa. There was a lot of speculation that the elections would be postponed again for the same reason, and many of the opposition parties claimed that the UNP and SLPP were purposely holding off the elections to avoid suffering a humiliating defeat. The Election Commission of Sri Lanka later announced March 9th as the date for the elections. Contrary to claims made by opposition parties, the ruling SLPP was the first to place their cash deposits for the elections, and many members of the party were confident that the SLPP would win the elections again.

Postponing of polls 
On 14 February, the Elections Commission announced that postal voting, originally scheduled from 22 to 24 February, would once again be postponed indefinitely, citing the Government printer's refusal to provide ballot papers without first receiving payment. The move made by the government printer was widely seen as another attempt by the government to postpone the elections, and the government came under heavy criticism from opposition parties as well as independent election observers.

By late February, people were doubtful that local government elections would even take place, due to issues between the elections commission and the government over the arrangement of funds for the election. On 23 February, President Ranil Wickremsinghe addressed the Parliament of Sri Lanka over the issue of the local elections. Wickremesinghe commented on a motion filed at the supreme court against the finance ministry on matters regarding the election. Wickremesinghe had previously informed the elections commission that it would not be sensible to carry out an election amidst the economic crisis and should only be held once the crisis is resolved and the local government members are reduced to 5,000. In a meeting between the president and the elections commission along with the prime minister and an attorney general, it was proposed that the polls should take place on 23 December 2022 but the elections commission rejected this due to the fact that nominations for the polls had not been accepted. Wickremesinghe claimed that in the 2023 budget, Rs. 8 billion was allocated for the elections, but the elections commission informed the government that Rs. 5 billion would be enough to conduct the election. The police, however, said they would require more funds due to costs for fuel and other factors.

Wickremesinghe emphasised the degree of conflict between the government, the elections commission and other parties. Later the president stated that an official requested funds for the election on behalf of the chairman of the national elections commissions which was against the constitution. Wickremesinghe revealed that the decision to hold the election was made by only two members of the elections commission, the other three members were forced to accept. According to Wickremesinghe, there was currently no election scheduled, as there was no official decision being taken by the national elections commissions. Wickremesinghe once again reiterated that he was not purposefully attempting to postpone the elections and the postponement was instead due to the government's lack of funds, due to Sri Lanka's economic circumstances. On 24 February, the local government elections were officially postponed, with the Election Commission stating that they would not be able to hold the election as scheduled on 9 March. The election commission later chose April 25th as the new date for the elections. 

Wickremsinghe's arguments were questioned by many political parties such as the Samagi Jana Balawegaya, the main opposition party of Sri Lanka. Leader of the Opposition Sajith Premadasa called out the president and noted that his party, the United National Party, had still submitted nominations despite the fact that the election was never officially scheduled as claimed by the president.

Polling 
During a survey conducted by Sri Lankan news channel Ada Derana through a series of social media polls, more than 93% of respondents said they were willing to vote for the National People's Power (NPP) led by Anura Kumara Dissanayaka. As for the two main parties of Sri Lanka, the Samagi Jana Balawegaya (SJB) and Sri Lanka Podujana Peramuna (SLPP), about 5% of respondents said they were willing to vote for one of the two parties.

Nominations

Contesting parties

Sri Lanka Podujana Peramuna
The ruling Sri Lanka Podujana Peramuna, the main constituent party of the Sri Lanka People's Freedom Alliance, saw many of its former allies defect to the opposition the previous year, including the Sri Lanka Freedom Party, to form their own opposition alliance, the Freedom People's Alliance. Since 2021, Sri Lanka had facing its most severe economic crisis since its independence in 1948 due to several reasons. The SLPP government thus began to grow increasingly unpopular; according to a poll conducted by Verité Research in March 2022, the government's approval rating had fallen to just 10% amidst the crisis and subsequent protests.

Despite all these major setbacks, the SLPP were adamant on contesting in the local elections, and many SLPP politicians were confident that the SLPP would win the elections again. There was also some speculation that the SLPP would be form an alliance and contest in the elections with the United National Party, the party of president Ranil Wickremesinghe, in some districts under the elephant symbol, in some districts under the flower bud symbol and in others under a common symbol.

Samagi Jana Balawegaya
The Samagi Jana Balawegaya, led by Leader of the Opposition Sajith Premadasa, will also contest in this election, under the telephone symbol. SJB parliamentarian Mujibur Rahman resigned his seat in parliament prior to the election, to run for Mayor of Colombo.

National People's Power
The National People's Power, led by Anura Kumara Dissanayaka of the Janatha Vimukthi Peramuna, will also contest in this election, under the compass symbol.

Freedom People's Alliance
The Freedom People's Alliance is a newly formed alliance consisting of 12 political parties formerly allied with the SLPFA government, including the Sri Lanka Freedom Party, the National Freedom Front and the Freedom People's Congress. These elections will be the alliance's first elections. The Sri Lanka Freedom Party will contest as part of the FPA for some seats and alone in others.

Notes

References

Sri Lanka
Local elections
Local elections in Sri Lanka
Sri Lanka